Knightsbridge Estates Trust Ltd v Byrne [1940] AC 613 is a UK insolvency law case, concerning the creation of a security interest.

Facts
Knightsbridge Estates wished to pay off the principle sum of the £310,000 loan from Mr Byrne’s insurance company. However, the contract stated the repayments would be made over 40 years, twice a year. If Knightsbridge paid off the principal early, it would reduce the total amount of interest it would pay to Mr Byrne. Knightsbridge Estates argued that the long repayment schedule was a clog on the equity of redemption. Byrne argued that because the loan counted as a debenture, under Companies Act 1929 section 74 (now Companies Act 2006, section 739) it was exempt from the rule of equity on clogs of redemption and the contract stayed as it was created.

In the Court of Appeal, Lord Greene MR held that the loan was a debenture. He said that this was ‘a commercial agreement between two important corporations, experienced in such matters, and has none of the features of an oppressive bargain.’

Judgment
The House of Lords upheld the Court of Appeal. Viscount Maugham gave the leading judgment holding that the loan was a debenture. He added that it could be a debenture for this provision of the Act, even if a mortgage might not be a debenture under every provision of the Act.

Lord Wright and Lord Atkin concurred.

Lord Romer gave a concurring judgment holding that the mortgage constituted a debenture under the Companies Act 1929 section 380 and was therefore not void under Companies Act 1929, section 74.

Lord Porter concurred.

Notes

References

United Kingdom insolvency case law
House of Lords cases
1940 in case law
1940 in British law